This is a list of neighbourhoods in Winnipeg, Manitoba, Canada. There are 236-237 neighbourhoods in Winnipeg.

Major wards/districts include St. Boniface, St. Norbert, St. Vital, Transcona, St. James-Assiniboia,  Tuxedo, Garden City, Fort Garry, Fort Rouge, River Heights, Charleswood, North Kildonan, West Kildonan, East Kildonan, the North End, the West End, the Northwest, and City Centre.

Neighbourhoods 

Neighbourhoods of Winnipeg as of the 2016 census.

AB

C

DEF

GHI

JK

L

M

NO

P

R

S

TU

V

W

Community areas and neighbourhood clusters 

Winnipeg has been subdivided into two levels of areas developed by the Community Data Network of the national Canadian Community Economic Development Network: Community areas and neighbourhood clusters.

Community areas are the broader, less detailed level of areas, which allow for geographical analysis and comparisons, i.e. census data, as used by Statistics Canada. Community areas are composed of neighbourhood clusters, which are used for planning and policy purposes by Manitoba Health and the Winnipeg Regional Health Authority (WRHA).

Wards

Business Improvement Zones 
Winnipeg's Business Improvement Zones (BIZ) are business districts established to enhances economic development for businesses in a particular neighbourhood. Each BIZ is governed and administered by a board, and is regulated by related BIZ by-laws passed by City Council.

, the City of Winnipeg has 16 Business Improvement Zones:

Other recognized areas

See also 
 Subdivisions of Winnipeg

References 



 
Neighbourhoods
Winnipeg